Epacris lanuginosa, commonly known as woolly-style heath, is a species of flowering plant in the family Ericaceae and is endemic to south-eastern Australia. It is a slender, erect shrub with hairy branchlets, linear to lance-shaped leaves, and tube-shaped, white flowers crowded along the ends of the branches.

Description 
Epacris lanuginosa is a slender, erect shrub that typically growing to a height of up to about and has woolly-hairy branchlets. The flowers are arranged on the ends of branches or along the upper  of the branches in leaf axils, each flower with up to thirteen to thirty bracts at the base. The anthers are enclosed in the petal tube. Flowering mainly occurs from August to January.

Taxonomy
Epacris lanuginosa was first formally described in 1805 by Jacques Labillardière in his Novae Hollandiae Plantarum Specimen. The specific epithet (lanuginosa) means "abounding in wool".

Distribution and habitat
Woolly-style heath is common in boggy places in Tasmania, but also occurs in wet heath, scrub and forest at low elevations, in southern and western Victoria and the Southern Tablelands of New South Wales.

Ecology
Epacris lanuginosa is susceptible to the exotic fungal rot root disease caused by Phytophthora cinnamomi.

References 

lanuginosa
Flora of New South Wales
Flora of Victoria (Australia)
Flora of Tasmania